SWX Europe, formerly virt-x (virt-x Exchange Limited) and Tradepoint, was an electronic cross-border share trading platform that operated between 1995 and 2009.  In 2009 all business was transferred to its owner SIX Swiss Exchange.

History
Tradepoint Investment Exchange was founded by three former employees of London Stock Exchange in 1995. It was an order-driven market, and was known as Tradepoint. As a Recognised Investment Exchange (RIE) based in London, it was supervised by the UK's Financial Services Authority (FSA).

In late 2002, it became the subject of a takeover offer by the Swiss exchange, SWX.  The sale was completed and at that point it became a wholly owned subsidiary of that group.  To reflect the new owner the name was changed to Virt-x which was short for virtual exchange.

In early 2008, virt-x formally changed its name to SWX Europe.

As of 30 April 2009, SWX Europe ceased trading and all business was transferred to SIX Swiss Exchange.

References

External links
SWX Europe Homepage

Former electronic trading platforms